Heraclea, Heracleia, Herakleia, or Heraclia may refer to:

Places
 Heraclea (island), in the Aegean Sea, today called Iraklia or Irakleia

Ancient cities

In Asia
 Heraclea Cybistra, Konya Province, Turkey
 Ereğli, Konya, the modern city
 Heraclea ad Latmum, near Lake Bafa, Turkey
 Heraclea Pontica, Zonguldak Province, Turkey
 Karadeniz Ereğli, the modern city
 Heraclea (Aeolis), a place in Aeolis near Melampagos, Turkey
 Heraclea (Lydia), a place in Lydia near Sipylus, Turkey
 Heraclea Salbace, a place in Caria near Mount Salbacus, Turkey
 , a place in Media (modern-day Iran)

In Europe
 Heraclea (Thracian Chersonese), a town in the Thracian Chersonese, now in Turkey
 Heraclea Lucania, Lucanian district of southern Italy
 Heraclea Lyncestis, a town founded by Philip II of Macedon near the modern town of Bitola, North Macedonia
 Heraclea Minoa, a town on the south coast of Sicily
 Heraclea Perinthus, city of ancient Thrace, now in Tekirdağ Province, Turkey
 Marmara Ereğlisi, the modern city
 Heraclea Sintica, now in Bulgaria 
 Heraclea in Trachis (also called Heraclea Trachinia), south of the river Spercheios to the west of Thermopylae
 Heraclea, ancient name of Saint-Tropez
 Herakleia (Acarnania), a city in Acarnania
 Heraclea (Athamania), a city of ancient Athamania
 Heracleia (Crete), a town of ancient Crete
 Heraclea (Elis), a city of ancient Elis
 Heraclea (Mygdonia), a town in Mygdonia
 , a place near Erice, Sicily
 , a place in Illyria, possibly on Hvar island

Modern places
 Eraclea, Italy
 Ereğli (disambiguation), various places in Turkey
 Irakleia (disambiguation), various places in Greece

Other uses
 , a Roman Catholic titular archbishopric
 Heracleia (festival), ancient festivals honoring the divine hero Heracles
 Heraclia (moth), a genus of moths in the family Noctuidae
 Battle of Heraclea in 280 BC between the Romans and a coalition of Greeks
 The Heracleia of Panyassis of Halicarnassus, a largely lost epic poem
 The Heracleia of Peisander of Rhodes, recounting the Labours of Heracles